Events from the year 1841 in the United States. It was the first calendar year to have three different presidents, which would only occur again in 1881.

Incumbents

Federal Government 
 President:
 until March 4: Martin Van Buren (D-New York)
 March 4–April 4: William Henry Harrison (W-Ohio)
 starting April 4: John Tyler (W/I-Virginia)
 Vice President:
 until March 4: Richard M. Johnson (D-Kentucky)
 March 4–April 4: John Tyler (W-Virginia)
 starting April 4: vacant
 Chief Justice: Roger B. Taney (Maryland)
 Speaker of the House of Representatives: Robert Mercer Taliaferro Hunter (W-Virginia) (until March 4), John White (W-Kentucky) (starting May 31)
 Congress: 26th (until March 4), 27th (starting March 4)

Events

 January 30 – A fire destroys 300 of the 500 housing units in Mayagüez, Puerto Rico, Spanish Empire.
 February 18–March 11 – First ongoing filibuster in the United States Senate.
 February 24 – Richland County is chartered by the Illinois General Assembly.
 March 4 – William Henry Harrison is sworn in as the ninth President of the United States, and John Tyler is sworn in as Vice President of the United States.
 March 9 – Amistad: The Supreme Court of the United States rules in the case that the Africans who seized control of the ship had been taken into slavery illegally.
 April 4 – President William Henry Harrison dies of pneumonia, becoming the first President of the United States to die in office and at one month, the president with the shortest term served. He is succeeded by Vice President John Tyler, who becomes the tenth President of the United States.
 April 6 – President John Tyler is sworn in.
 April 20 – Edgar Allan Poe's short story "The Murders in the Rue Morgue" is published in Graham's Magazine (Philadelphia) (of which he became editor in February). The story will be recognized as the first significant work of detective fiction.
 June 21 – Fordham University is opened in The Bronx by the Society of Jesus as St. John's College.
 July 28 – Mary Rogers, the "Beautiful Cigar Girl", is found murdered in New York City.
 August 16 – U.S. President John Tyler vetoes a bill which called for the re-establishment of the Second Bank of the United States. Enraged Whig Party members riot outside the White House in the most violent demonstration on White House grounds in U.S. history.
 September 17 – John C. Colt murders Samuel Adams in an argument over a business debt in New York City.
 c. November – The city of Dallas in Texas is founded by John Neely Bryan.
 Frederick Douglass speaks at the Massachusetts Anti-slavery Society Convention.
 Iconic chocolate company Whitman's is established when Stephen F. Whitman opens a small retail "confectionery and fruiterer shop" at Third and Market Streets in Philadelphia.
 P. T. Barnum purchases Scudder's American Museum in New York City.
 John Augustus develops the concept of probation in Boston, Massachusetts, by standing bail for lesser offenders.
 The first steam self-propelled fire engine in the U.S. is completed by Paul Rapsey Hodge for use in New York City.

Ongoing
 Second Seminole War (1835–1842)

Births
 March 1 – Blanche Bruce, U.S. Senator from Mississippi from 1875 to 1881 (died 1898)
 March 10 – Ina Coolbrith, poet (died 1928)
 May 10 –  James Gordon Bennett, Jr., newspaper publisher (died 1918)
 April 8 – William J. Babcock, Medal of Honor recipient (died 1897)
 May 15
 James Henderson Berry, U.S. Senator from Arkansas from 1885 to 1907 (died 1913)
 Clarence Dutton, geologist (died 1912)
 June 1 – Edward Lyon Buchwalter, businessman (died 1933)
 July 5 – Mary Arthur McElroy, de facto First Lady of the United States from 1881 to 1885 (died 1917)
 July 11 – James A. Barber, Medal of Honor recipient (died 1925)
 September 8 – Charles J. Guiteau, assassin of President James A. Garfield (executed 1882)
 October 12 – Joseph O'Dwyer, physician (died 1898)
 October 18 – Bishop W. Perkins, U.S. Senator from Kansas from 1892 to 1893 (died 1894)
 October 29 – William Harris, U.S. Senator from Kansas from 1897 to 1903 (died 1909)
 November 6 – Nelson W. Aldrich, U.S. Senator from Rhode Island from 1881 to 1911 (died 1915)
 November 13 – Edward Burd Grubb, Jr., American Civil War Union Brevet Brigadier General (died 1913)
 December 8 – Thomas R. Bard, U.S. Senator from California from 1900 to 1905 (died 1915)
 Jennie de la Montagnie Lozier, physician (died 1915)

Deaths
 February 25 – Philip P. Barbour, Associate Justice of the U.S. Supreme Court from 1836 to 1841 (born 1783)
 April 4 – William Henry Harrison, ninth President of the United States from March to April 1841 (born 1773)
 September 25 – John Chandler, politician (born 1762)
 October 6 – George Childress, lawyer and politician (born 1804)
 October 21 – John Forsyth, U.S. Senator from Georgia from 1818 to 1819 and 1829 to 1834 (born 1780)

See also
Timeline of United States history (1820–1859)

References

External links 
 

 
1840s in the United States
United States
United States
Years of the 19th century in the United States